Bienvenida Sanz was a Spanish film editor active in the 1940s and 1950s.

Selected filmography 

 La belle de Cadix (1953)
 Noventa minutos (1949)
 Loyola, the Soldier Saint (1949)
 Cuatro mujeres (1947)
 La nao Capitana (1947)
 The Crime of Bordadores Street (1946)
 Los últimos de Filipinas (1945)
 Canelita en rama (1943)
 El huésped del sevillano (1940)

References 

Spanish women film editors
Spanish film editors
Year of birth missing
Year of death missing